Claudio Mele (born January 23, 1968 in Buenos Aires, Argentina) is a former Argentine footballer who played for clubs of Argentina and Chile.

Teams
  Almirante Brown 1990-1993
  Gimnasia y Tiro de Salta 1993-1995
  Huracán de Corrientes 1995-1997
  Deportes Concepción 1998-1999
  Cobreloa 2000-2002
  Almirante Brown 2003-2004
  Estudiantes de Buenos Aires 2004-2005
  Chupapicos Boys 2005-2007

Titles
  Cobreloa 2001 (Copa Libertadores Playoff Chilean Championship)

External links
 
 Profile at En una Baldosa 
 

1968 births
Living people
Argentine footballers
Argentine expatriate footballers
Club Almirante Brown footballers
Huracán Corrientes footballers
Estudiantes de Buenos Aires footballers
Gimnasia y Tiro footballers
Deportes Concepción (Chile) footballers
Cobreloa footballers
Chilean Primera División players
Expatriate footballers in Chile
Association footballers not categorized by position
Footballers from Buenos Aires